Music You Can't Get Out of Your Head is recording of the music by Peter Schickele writing as P. D. Q. Bach. The album describes itself as "P.D.Q. Bach’s answer to Haydn’s "Farewell" Symphony" and includes "all the music from The Civilian Barber that's been discovered." The album was released on Vanguard Records in 1982.

Performers
Professor Peter Schickele conducting the New York Pick-Up Ensemble
Marilyn Brustadt, off-coloratura soprano
Paul Dunkel and Diva Goodfriend-Koven, pumpflute
Lauren Goldstein, Bill Becker, and Abdul Falafel, double reed hookah
Early Anderson, Polizeiposaune (police trombone) and trombonus interruptus

Track listing 
"Howdy" Symphony in D Major, S. 6 7/8
Introduzione casuale; Allegro con mucho brio
Andante con mojo
Menuetto allegretto
Come un pipistrello fuori dall' inferno
"Perückenstück" (Hair Piece) from "The Civilian Barber", S. 4F
Suite from "The Civilian Barber", S. 4F
Entrance of the dragoons (tempo di Marsha)
Dance of St. Vitus
His majesty's minuet
Fanfare for the royal shaft
Her majesty's minuet
Departure of the dragoons (tempo di on the double)

Sources
 P.D.Q. Bach: Music You Can't Get Out of Your Head, album details

P. D. Q. Bach albums
1982 albums
1980s comedy albums
Vanguard Records albums